Bottomless means having no bottom or lower limit. It may also refer to:
 Bottomless beverage, a drink with unlimited refills
 Nudity beneath the waist

See also 
 
 Bottom (disambiguation)
 Bottomless pit (disambiguation)
 Topless (disambiguation)